Tahliq Raymond Rogers (May 14, 1971 – March 28, 1999), better known as Freaky Tah, was an American rapper and hype man. Freaky Tah was a member of a hip hop group called the Lost Boyz, together with Mr. Cheeks, DJ Spigg Nice, and Pretty Lou.

Murder
On the night of March 28, 1999, after leaving Mr. Cheeks' birthday party with friends William Brown and Thomas Roman of Boston, Massachusetts, Rogers was fatally shot by Kelvin Jones while he was going towards the exit of a Sheraton hotel in Queens, New York. It was a case of mistaken identity. He was pronounced dead at the nearby Jamaica Hospital. He was aged 27 at the time of his death.

The getaway driver, Raheem Fletcher, was sentenced to seven years in prison. Jones pleaded guilty to murder and was sentenced to a minimum of 15 years for second degree murder. As of 2022 Jones was incarcerated at Elmira Correctional Facility in Upstate New York. He became eligible for parole in 2014, and was denied.  He will become eligible again in 2023.

Discography

With The Lost Boyz

See also
List of murdered hip hop musicians
27 Club

References

External links
 LB Fam Online
 [ Allmusic page]
 "Lifestyles Of The Rich & Shameless" music video

1971 births
1999 deaths
1999 murders in the United States
African-American male rappers
Deaths by firearm in Queens, New York
People from Queens, New York
Rappers from New York City
20th-century American rappers
20th-century American male musicians
20th-century African-American musicians
Male murder victims